Karl Murdock Bowman (November 4, 1888 – March 2, 1973) was a pioneer in the study of psychiatry. From 1944 to 1946 he was the president of the American Psychiatric Association. His work in alcoholism, schizophrenia, and homosexuality is particularly often cited.

Family and education

Bowman was born in Topeka, Kansas, and graduated from Washburn University. His nickname in college was "Tommy," according to the school's 1910 yearbook. While at Washburn, he was a member and president of the Delta Phi Fraternity, forerunner of the Kansas Beta chapter of Phi Delta Theta Fraternity. Bowman was initiated into Phi Delta Theta with the chapter’s founding fathers on October 1, 1910. In 1913, he graduated from medical school at the University of California, Berkeley with his M.D.

Bowman was married to the former Eliza Abbot Stearns. Together they had four sons, Walter M. Bowman, Thomas E. Bowman, Murdock S. Bowman, and Richard S. Bowman, and 13 grandchildren.

During World War I, Bowman was a captain in the Army Medical Corps from 1917 to 1919.

Psychiatric work

In the course of his career, Bowman conducted pioneering work on the psychiatric effects of alcohol, drugs, and sexuality. He also conducted research on schizophrenia and the use of insulin shock therapy. He testified at the trials of Nathan F. Leopold and Richard Loeb for the murder of Robert Franks in 1924 as well as in many other celebrated cases.

During his career, Bowman was the chief medical officer at the Boston Psychopathic Hospital; an assistant professor of psychiatry at Harvard Medical School (1921–1936); the chief of psychiatry at Bellevue Hospital (1936–1941); a professor of psychiatry at New York University Medical College (1936–1941); the first chairman and director of the Langley Porter Psychiatric Institute (1941–1956); and a professor at the University of California, Berkeley. He was also the head of the Laguna Honda Psychiatric Hospital in San Francisco (1941–1967) 

As the retiring president of the American Psychiatric Association in 1946, he made headlines when he predicted that 10 million people in the United States would at some time in their lives require hospitalization for mental disorders. Bowman was also a board member of the American Board of Psychiatry and Neurology.

Alcoholism

Bowman was Head of the Department of Psychiatry at Bellevue Hospital in New York City when Dr. Allen Gregg (Director of the Rockefeller Foundation) asked him to participate in an alcoholism study he had been preparing. Bowman was interested in this project but wished to have a part in leading the study. In 1938, Bowman joined the Moore Group. This group founded the "Research Council on Problems of Alcohol" or the RCPA, which was an organization similar to Alcoholics Anonymous. Soon after it was created, Bowman became a leader of this organization. With E. Morton Jellinek, he co-wrote an influential 1941 article, "Alcohol Addiction and Its Treatment," synthesizing prior typologies of alcoholism and classifying alcoholics into four types, which was the basis of Jellinek's later five-stage typology. He also researched and wrote on marijuana.

Schizophrenia

Karl Bowman read his article "The Modern Treatment of Schizophrenia" at the New York Academy of Medicine in New York on February 17, 1939. During his reading, Bowman stated, "over one half  of the population of State Hospitals" consisted of patients diagnosed with schizophrenia. He claimed that this psychological disorder did not shorten the lifespan of the patient, but resulted in the deterioration of the patient's brain. In his article, Bowman addresses many different methods that were used throughout history to help treat schizophrenia. For example, fever therapy  consisted of inducing a fever in the patient using various methods, such as the malaria virus, but did not produce effective results in the treatment of schizophrenia. Sleep therapy was carried out using sleep-inducing substances such as marijuana, opium, and somnifen. Bowman also addresses stimulus therapy; this method had only temporary effects. Bowman recommended the insulin method as effective, with longer-lasting effects and more indications of long-term improvement. Bowman was optimistic about schizophrenia patients whose conditions had improved or had been cured and also about future treatment methods for schizophrenia patients.

Homosexuality
During the 1950s and 1960s, Bowman collaborated in a number of studies on homosexuality and wrote a report on it for the State of California. In 1953, in "The Problem of Homosexuality," co-authored with Bernice Engle, he argued for multiple causes, including genetics, but proposed that castration be studied as a cure. However, in 1961 he appeared in the television documentary The Rejected presenting the viewpoint that homosexuality is not a mental illness and should be legalized.

Selected works

Books
 Personal Problems for Men and Women. New York: Greenberg, 1931. OCLC 1114346. Repr. as Towards Peace of Mind: Everyday Problems of Mental Health. London: Unwin, 1936. OCLC 2475650
 Final report on California sexual deviation research: March, 1954. Sacramento: State of California, 1954.
 My years in psychiatry, 1915-1968: an interview with Karl M. Bowman, M.D., San Francisco, February 27 and 28, 1968. California State Department of Mental Hygiene. Sacramento: State of California, 1969. OCLC 58860757

Articles
 "Factors Determining the Development of Natural and Unnatural Habit Movements." Dental Cosmos 70.1, January 1928. pp. 35–44
 "Practical Clinical Psychiatry for Students and Practitioners." American Journal of Public Health 21.9, September 1931. pp. 1074–75
 "The Sciences of Man in the Making: An Orientation Book." American Journal of Public Health 23.4, April 1933. p. 391
 "Modern Treatment of Schizophrenia." Bulletin of the New York Academy of Medicine 15.5, May 1939. pp. 338–53. PubMed 1911385
 with Walter Goldfarb, Sam Parker, B. Krautman. "The Treatment of Acute Alcoholism with Glucose and Insulin." Journal of Clinical Investigation 18.5, September 1939. pp. 581–84
 "Liquor, Servant of Man." American Journal of Public Health 30.3 (1940) 296
 with Samuel Allentuck. "The Psychiatric Aspects of Marihuana Intoxication." American Journal of Psychiatry 99 (1942) 248–51. Online at UKCIA.org.
 with E. Morton Jellinek. "Alcohol Addiction and Its Treatment." Quarterly Journal of Studies on Alcohol 2 (1941) 98–176. pdf at University of Wisconsin. Reprinted in Alcohol Addiction and Chronic Alcoholism. Effects of Alcohol on the Individual: A Critical Exposition of Present Knowledge volume 1. Ed. E. Morton Jellinek. Research Council on Problems of Alcohol, Scientific Committee. New Haven, Connecticut / London: Oxford, 1942. OCLC 63622529
 "Psychiatric Aspects of Marihuana Intoxication." Journal of the American Medical Association 125.5 (1944) pp. 376. 
 with Jurgen Ruesch. "Prolonged Post-Traumatic Syndromes Following Head Injury." American Journal of Psychiatry 102.2, September 1945. 145–63. abstract
 with Bernice Engle. "The Problem of Homosexuality." Journal of Social Hygiene 39.1 (1953) 3–16.
 with Gene Gordon. "The Auxiliary Treatment of Psychotic Women—Group Therapy for Their Husbands." California Medicine 78.4, April 1953. pp. 303–08
 with Bernice Engle. "A Psychiatric Evaluation of Laws of Homosexuality". Temple Law Quarterly 29.3, Spring 1956. pp. 273–326.

References

External links

 Works by Karl M. Bowman at OCLC WorldCat

1888 births
1973 deaths
People from Topeka, Kansas
American psychiatrists
Washburn University alumni
University of California, Berkeley alumni
University of California, Berkeley faculty
Harvard Medical School faculty
New York University Grossman School of Medicine faculty
United States Army Medical Corps officers
United States Army personnel of World War I
Military personnel from California